Busogo is a town in the Busogo sector of Musanze district, Northern Province, Rwanda.

Populated places in Rwanda